The 1908 County Championship was the 19th officially organised running of the County Championship, and ran from 4 May to 31 August 1908. Yorkshire won their eighth championship title, while Kent finished in second place. The previous season's winners, Nottinghamshire, finished in eighth place. In May, Yorkshire bowled out Northamptonshire for 27 and 14, the lowest aggregate in first-class cricket at that point.

Table
 One point was awarded for a win, and one point was taken away for each loss. Final placings were decided by dividing the number of points earned by the number of completed matches (i.e. those that ended in a win or a loss), and multiplying by 100.

Records

Batting

References

1908 in English cricket
County Championship seasons
County